'St Joseph's Young Priest's Society' is a Roman Catholic Lay organisation which supports the training of young men to become priests, it also promotes the vocation of the laity and fosters a greater understanding and love of the Mass.
Founded by Olivia Taaffe, who in 1895 published an Irish edition of the magazine, with the help of Fr. Joseph Darlington SJ and Fr. Harry Browne, for the Arch-confraternity of St. Joseph at Maranville, France, from this the St. Joseph's Young Priests Society developed. The Sheaf is published today as the newsletter for the society.

Over its existence the Society has helped students from every Irish diocese, Great Britain, Asia, America and Africa. 
The Society has branches which meet regularly in many parishes of Ireland, It also hosts an annual pilgrimage to Knock.

External links
 St Josephs Young Priests Society, official site

References

Catholic lay organisations
1895 establishments in Ireland
Catholic organizations established in the 19th century